Greenhalgh is a surname.

Greenhalgh may also refer to:

Greenhalgh (F46), Brazilian Navy frigate, formerly HMS Broadsword (F88) 
Greenhalgh Castle, a ruin near Garstang in Lancashire, England
Greenhalgh, Lancashire, a village in England